300 m standard rifle is one of the ISSF shooting events. It is similar to 300 metre rifle but there are more restrictions on the rifle (quite similar to those in 10 metre air rifle). The course of fire is a three positions program of 3x20 shots. This event is based in competitions with army-style rifles, and as such dates back at least to the 19th century, although the early championships had a true army rifle event, using the model of the host country's choice. The standard rifle event as such was created in 1947.

300 metre standard rifle is also on the program of the CISM military world championships.

Equipment 
The rifle must satisfy dimensions, weight and other requirements stipulated in the rulebook. Sights may be iron sights only, and muzzle brakes are not permitted. Trigger pull weight must be minimum 1500 grams, maximum barrel length is 762 mm, maximum calibre is 8 mm (although 6 mm BR is the most common), and maximum total weight of the rifle is 5.5 kg. The same rifle must be used in all positions without any changes except adjustment of the butt plate, handstop or rear sight.

World Championships, Men

World Championships, Men Team

World Championships, total medals

Current world records

See also
 European Shooting Confederation
 International Shooting Sport Federation
 ISSF shooting events
 1959 European 300 m Rifle Championships

References

External links
 

ISSF shooting events
Rifle shooting sports